This is a list of the   biological mothers of Ottoman sultans. There were thirty-six sultans of the Ottoman Empire in twenty-one generations. (During early days the title Bey was used instead of Sultan) Throughout the six-century history the sultans were the members of the same house, namely the House of Ottoman (Turkish: Osmanlı Hanedanı).

Mothers of the Ottoman Sultans 
This list is distinct from the list of Valide Sultans of the Ottoman Empire. Valide Sultan was the title of the mother of the reigning sultan. The mothers who died before their sons' accession to throne, never assumed the title of Valide Sultan like Hürrem, Muazzez, Mihrişah, and Şermi. On the other hand, step mothers who were not the biological mothers but raised the princes whose mothers had died assumed the title of Valide Sultan like Perestu. So there were Valide Sultans who were not the mothers, and there were mothers who were not the Valide Sultans.

The detailed list of the mothers

See also 
 List of Ottoman titles and appellations
 Valide sultan
 Haseki sultan

References

Sources

Mothers of Ottoman sultans
Mothers, Ottoman sultans
Mothers, Ottoman sultans
Ottoman